During the 1995–96 English football season, Everton F.C. competed in the FA Premier League (known as the FA Carling Premiership for sponsorship reasons).

Season summary
A great season of tremendous goalscoring from the lightning quick feet of Andrei Kanchelskis, Everton's dramatic signing from vanquished foes Manchester United following on from, the great FA Cup Final victory last season, gave Everton fans a lot of fine moments as they finished a very creditable 6th in the Premier League under manager Joe Royle, finishing just one place and two points short of a UEFA Cup place. However, Everton failed to make an impact either of the domestic cups or in their first European campaign in a decade. At the end of the season, Royle agreed a £3.5million fee with Leeds United for midfielder Gary Speed.

Final league table

Results summary

Results by round

Results
Everton's score comes first

Legend

FA Premier League

FA Charity Shield

FA Cup

League Cup

UEFA Cup Winners' Cup

Squad

Left club during the season

Reserve squad

Transfers

In

Out

Transfers in:  £7,490,000
Transfers out:  £650,000
Total spending:  £6,840,000

References

Everton F.C. seasons
Everton